A number of species of non-marine molluscs are found in the wild in Namibia.

There are no endemic species of freshwater molluscs in Namibia.

Class: Gastropoda

Freshwater gastropods 
Freshwater gastropods in Namibia include 26 species in 9 families:

Planorbidae
 Bulinus tropicus (Krauss, 1848)

Land gastropods 
Land gastropods in Namibia include:

Agriolimacidae
 Deroceras laeve (O. F. Müller, 1774) - non-indigenous

Sculptariidae
 Sculptaria kaokoensis Zilch 1952
 Sculptaria namaquensis

Dorcasiidae
 Dorcasia alexandri Gray, 1838
 Dorcasia connollyi
 Dorcasia montana
 Trigonephrus haughtoni Connolly
 Trigonephrus ruficornis Serville 1838

Pupillidae
 Gibbulinopsis fontana
 Pupoides calaharicus

Subulinidae
 Xerocerastus minutus Zilch

Veronicellidae
 Laevicaulis alte (Férussac, 1821)

Class: Bivalvia

Freshwater bivalves
Freshwater bivalves in Namibia include 13 species in 5 families:

See also
 List of marine molluscs of Namibia

Lists of molluscs of surrounding countries:
 List of non-marine molluscs of Angola, Wildlife of Angola
 List of non-marine molluscs of Zambia, Wildlife of Zambia
 List of non-marine molluscs of Botswana, Wildlife of Botswana
 List of non-marine molluscs of South Africa, Wildlife of South Africa

References

Further reading 
 Brown D. S., Curtis B. A., Bethune S. & Appleton C. C. (1992). "Freshwater snails of East Caprivi and the lower Okavango River Basin in Namibia and Botswana. Hydrobiologia 246(1): 9-40. .
 Curtis B. A. (1999). "Inter-basin transfer of freshwater molluscs from the Kunene River Basin to Olushandja Dam in the Cuvelai Basin in north-western Namibia". Cimbebasia 15: 155-161.
 Curtis B. A. (1990). "Investigation into the distribution of freshwater snails and snail-borne diseases in Namibia and the possibility of spreading these diseases, with special reference to the potential role of the Eastern National Water Carrier". Internal report. Windhoek: State Museum of Namibia. 21 pp.
 Curtis B. A. (1991). "Freshwater macro-invertebrates of Namibia". In: Simmons R. E., Brown C. J. & Griffin M. (eds). "The Status and Conservation of Wetlands in Namibia". Madoqua 17: 163-187.
 Curtis B. A. (1995). "Investigation into the distribution of freshwater snails and snail-borne diseases associated with the Calueque-Olushandja Water Supply Network in the Omusati and Oshana regions of Namibia". In: Environmental Assessment of the Olushandja Dam, Northern Namibia. Cape Town: Environmental Evaluation Unit, University of Cape Town.

External links 
 Gastropoda (including marine species) at Namibia Biodiversity Database web site
 Bivalvia (including marine species) at Namibia Biodiversity Database web site

 Non marine moll

Molluscs
Namibia
Namibia